The Micrelytrinae are a subfamily of bugs in the family Alydidae, based on the type genus  Micrelytra Laporte, 1833.  Genera are recorded from the Americas, Europe and Asia.

Tribes and Genera 
The Coreoidea Species File lists three tribes:

Leptocorisini
Auth.: Stål, 1872 (synonym Leptocorisaria Stål)
 Bloeteocoris Ahmad, 1965
 Grypocephalus Hsiao, 1963
 Leptocorisa Latreille, 1829
 Mutusca Stål, 1866
 Stenocoris Burmeister, 1839

Micrelytrini
Auth.: Stål, 1868
 Acestra Dallas, 1852
 Anacestra Hsiao, 1964
 Bactrocoris Kormilev, 1953
 Bactrodosoma Stål, 1860
 Bactrophya Breddin, 1901
 Bactrophyamixia Brailovsky, 1991
 Calamocoris Breddin, 1901
 Cydamus Stål, 1860
 Darmistus Stål, 1860
 Dulichius Stål, 1866
 Esperanza Barber, 1906
 Eudarmistus Breddin, 1903
 Longicoris Ahmad, 1968
 Marcius (insect) Stål, 1865
 Micrelytra Laporte, 1833  (monotypic type genus)
 Paramarcius Hsiao, 1964
 Paraplesius Scott, 1874
 Protenor Stål, 1868
 Slateria Ahmad, 1965
 Stachyolobus Stål, 1871
 Trachelium (insect) Herrich-Schäffer, 1850
 Tuberculiformia Ahmad, 1967

Noliphini
Auth.: Ahmad, 1965
 Cosmoleptus Stål, 1873
 Lyrnessus (insect) Stål, 1862
 Noliphus Stål, 1859
 †Orthriocorisa Scudder, 1890

References

External links

 
Hemiptera subfamilies
Alydidae